Medvezhiy, medvezhy, or medvezhyi are transliterations of медве́жьи, the Russian word for bear, and can refer to:

 Medvezhiy Glacier
 Medvezhy Island, in the Sea of Okhotsk
 Medvezhy Ruchey mine
 Medvezhy Vzvoz, a village
 Medvezhyi Islands, in the East Siberian Sea